Westnet is a Perth-based Australian telecommunications company providing broadband ADSL, broadband ADSL2+, satellite broadband, dialup Internet, telephony and web-hosting services to homes and businesses across Australia.

History
Founded in the Western Australian city of Geraldton in 1994 by Chris and Rhonda Thomas, Westnet began in a spare bedroom. In 1996 it was purchased by local company Mitchell and Brown Communications and experienced rapid growth over the years as a local internet service provider to the Geraldton region. With this expansion came the necessity of larger premises, which saw Westnet relocate to St Martins Tower in Perth in 1999. 

Westnet completed the move to new premises in Central Park Tower, Perth. The move was in response to continued growth, and requirements for expanded office space for staff and resources.

In 2004, Westnet began offering a telephone service in addition to its internet products. At this time, the company began referring to itself as a telecommunications service provider, rather than only an internet service provider.

Acquisition by iiNet
On 8 May 2008 Western Australian based internet service provider iiNet acquired Westnet for $81 million. The two companies continue to trade separately, but share many functions.

In March 2015 iiNet was bought by TPG in a $1.4 billion deal, effectively making TPG the parent company of Westnet. Westnet continues to operate as a separate brand with only a handful of products that differ at all from other iiNet or Internode offerings.

Bandwidth management

P2P deprioritisation
In June 2007, Westnet stated that it had been "trialling" traffic prioritisation for a year, deprioritising peer-to-peer traffic, and would be continuing to do so in future. The announcement was made on the Westnet Blog and on Whirlpool.net.au, to mixed reactions. Some praised Westnet for openly declaring its use of prioritisation, while others (including a Whirlpool News editorial) criticised the company for using it silently for a year, or for doing so at all. Whirlpool News's article also suggested that the admission followed assertions by competing ISP Exetel that it was not the only ISP restricting peer-to-peer traffic.

Awards
Westnet has won the following awards:

 2008 Customer Service Institute of Australia – National Medium Business of the Year
 2008 Customer Service Institute of Australia – Excellence in a Contact Centre (WA)
 16th and 17th ACNielsen Consult Australian Online Survey
 Best ISP – PC Authority Reliability and Service Awards 2007, 2008

See also

 Internet in Australia

References

External links

Internet service providers of Australia
Companies based in Perth, Western Australia
Telecommunications companies established in 1994
IiNet acquisitions